The 1906–07 Scottish Division Two was won by St Bernard's, with Ayr Parkhouse finishing bottom.

Table

References 

 Scottish Football Archive

Scottish Division Two seasons
2